Seyyed Musa (also Romanized as Seyyed Mūsá; also known as Cherīyeh-ye Seyyed Mūsá) is a village in Ben Moala Rural District, in the Central District of Shush County, Khuzestan Province, Iran. At the 2006 census, its population was 110, in 21 families.

References 

Populated places in Shush County